Rhein-Neckar-Verkehr GmbH (RNV, Rhine-Neckar Transport Ltd) is a company operating public transport (specifically bus and tram services) in the Rhine-Neckar region of Germany,  including the cities of Heidelberg, Mannheim and Ludwigshafen am Rhein.

History
RNV was established on 1 October 2004 as a joint subsidiary of the five principal public transport operators that had previously operated in the region:
 the Heidelberg Tramway (Heidelberger Straßen- und Bergbahn, HSB),
 MVV Transport (MVV Verkehr, the operator of trams and buses in Mannheim),
 the Upper Rhine Railway Company (Oberrheinische Eisenbahn, which became part of the MVV Group in the early 2000s and was then known as MVV OEG),
 the operator of the Rhine-Haardt Railway (Rhein-Haardt Bahn, RHB) and
 Verkehrsbetriebe Ludwigshafen (the operator of buses and trams in Ludwigshafen, VBL).

RNV is a public sector operation, as its ultimate beneficial owners are local authorities in the region.

Since 1 March 2005, RNV provides transport services on behalf of its parent companies. Fares are set by the local passenger transport executive, Verkehrsverbund Rhein-Neckar (VRN).

It commenced operations with a 188 kilometre network and 400 vehicles.

References

Railway companies established in 2004
Transport in Baden-Württemberg
2004 establishments in Germany